Ishita Raj Sharma (born 12 July 1990) is an Indian actress and model, best known for her work in Pyaar Ka Punchnama, Pyaar Ka Punchnama 2 and Sonu Ke Titu Ki Sweety.

Education 

Ishita studied at Delhi Public School, Mathura Road, New Delhi and then went onto to complete her B. Com. from Gargi College (Delhi University), New Delhi. She then moved to England to pursue a major in business.

Career
Ishita acted in Pyaar Ka Punchnama (2011), produced by Wide Frame Pictures in which she played one of the three girls named Charu. The film became a sleeper hit with newcomers in the lead. It has achieved a cult status among the youth. Ishita Sharma also worked in Meeruthiya Gangsters in 2015.

Ishita was in Luv Ranjan’s Pyaar Ka Punchnama 2, in which she was paired with Omkar Kapoor. In 2018, she featured in Sonu Ke Titu Ki Sweety, which crossed more than  100 crore in India.

Filmography

References

External links

 
 
 
 

Indian film actresses
Indian female models
Living people
Actresses from Mumbai
21st-century Indian actresses
1990 births